2012–13 Premier League may refer to a number of professional sports league seasons:

 Association football

 2012–13 Armenian Premier League
 2012–13 Azerbaijan Premier League
 2012–13 Premier League of Belize
 2012–13 Premier League of Bosnia and Herzegovina
 2012–13 Egyptian Premier League
 2012–13 Premier League (England)
 2012–13 Israeli Premier League
 2012–13 Kuwaiti Premier League
 2012–13 Lebanese Premier League
 2012–13 Maltese Premier League
 2012–13 National Premier League (Jamaica)
 2012–13 Premier Soccer League (South Africa)
 2012–13 Russian Premier League
 2012–13 Scottish Premier League
 2012–13 Syrian Premier League
 2012–13 Ukrainian Premier League
 2012–13 Welsh Premier League